Ruslan Valeyev (born 31 October 1981) is a Ukrainian former professional footballer who played as a midfielder.

Club career
Valeyev was born in Odessa, Ukrainian SSR, Soviet Union. He got his first football training at the youth team of Chornomorets. However, in 1998 he moved to Germany to continue his training with the Bundesliga club Borussia Mönchengladbach, where he trained alongside his friend Andriy Voronin.

From there, in 2000, Valeyev moved to play in the Eredivisie, for De Graafschap. He spent five years with the team, amassing 129 caps and scoring 16 goals. In the 2002–03 season he suffered an injury sidelining him for a part of the season, in which time De Graafschap were relegated to the Eerste Divisie. He stayed with the team for the next season, helping the team return to the Eredivisie. The following season was not as good for Ruslan, as he only managed one goal in 18 appearances. The club was again relegated to the Eerste Divisie.

Valeyev had offers from a few clubs in the Eredivisie but chose to sign a one-year contract with FC Emmen who were playing in the Eerste Divisie. After a good first season he signed another one-year contract. Valeyev played for Emmen in 54 games and managed to score 4 goals. In July 2007, Valeyev returned to play for his home club Chornomorets, where his younger brother Rinar Valeyev is also a player.

International career
Valeyev was capped 20 times for the Ukraine U20 national team, scoring 3 goals, as well as playing 6 times and scoring one international goal for the Ukraine U21. He was a member of the U19 team that finished second at the UEFA European Under-19 Football Championship in 2000. He also participated in the 2001 FIFA World Youth Championship tournament in Argentina, reaching the Round of 16.

See also
 2001 FIFA World Youth Championship squads#Ukraine

External links
 Profile on Official Chornomorets Website 
 Profile and season stats on Odessa Football 
 Short bio 

1981 births
Living people
Ukrainian people of Tatar descent
Ukrainian footballers
Footballers from Odesa
Association football midfielders
Ukraine under-21 international footballers
Ukraine youth international footballers
Eredivisie players
Eerste Divisie players
FC Chornomorets Odesa players
Borussia Mönchengladbach players
De Graafschap players
FC Emmen players
FC Shinnik Yaroslavl players
Ukrainian football managers
Ukrainian expatriate footballers
Ukrainian expatriate sportspeople in Germany
Expatriate footballers in Germany
Ukrainian expatriate sportspeople in the Netherlands
Expatriate footballers in the Netherlands
Ukrainian expatriate sportspeople in Russia
Expatriate footballers in Russia